Adidam Mummery Sacred Theatre is a contemporary sacred use of the mummery theatre concept that has arisen within a small New Religious Movement named Adidam.  

The founder and Spiritual Teacher of Adidam, named Adi Da, wrote what is now called The Mummery Book, (which  he  first  began writing in 1957) expanded over many years  into what he calls a  “Liturgical Theatre”.  It is performed at the Adidam Ashram (or Retreat Sanctuary) named “The Mountain of Attention”, located in Clear Lakes Highland in Northern California, at least once annually  and often several times a year.  It uses artistically talented formal members of Adidam with some professional help.  

The central theme, meaning and script content of The Mummery Book and its theatrical impact appear to be related (most closely) to this definition of mummery:  "a ridiculous, hypocritical, or pretentious ceremony or performance."

Notes

New religious movements
Folk plays